Lac qui Parle County is a county in the U.S. state of Minnesota. As of the 2020 census, the population was 6,719. Its county seat is Madison. The largest city in the county is Dawson.

History
The name of the county is French for "Lake who speaks."

In 1862 the Minnesota legislature authorized creation of a county to be called Lac qui Parle on an area north of the Minnesota River. However, that initiative was not approved by the local voters affected, so the proposed county did not come into existence. Nine years later (March 6, 1871) the legislature authorized creation of the present Lac qui Parle County, south of the Minnesota River, and it was approved by local voters. The county seat was established at Lac qui Parle village.

In 1884 a settlement was platted at the railway stop in Madison Township (named for Madison, Wisconsin). The settlement, also named Madison, was incorporated in 1885, and in 1889 the county government was moved from Lac qui Parle village to this new town, which incorporated as a city in 1902.

In 1886, a county-wide election chose Madison as the county seat.  150 men and 40 teams of horses rode to Lac qui Parle village, where the town hall was at the time, and dragged the building to Madison.

A new county courthouse was built in Madison in 1899, and in 1903 the Madison City Hall was completed. A total of four fires swept the city's main area during the early years of the twentieth century, resulting in most wood structures in the area being replaced with brick buildings.

A March 2011 study by the University of Wisconsin–Madison and the Robert Wood Johnson Foundation ranked this as Minnesota's healthiest county.

The county reached its peak population of 15,554 in 1920. However, the county seat continued its population growth until 1960, when 2,380 residents were counted.

Geography
Lac qui Parle County is on the west side of Minnesota. Its west border abuts the east border of the state of South Dakota. The Minnesota River flows southeastward along the county's NE border, creating Marsh Lake and Lac qui Parle Reservoir The Minnesota River flow is augmented by Yellow Bank River near the county's north corner, and by Lac qui Parle River near the county's east border. The south fork of the Yellow Bank flows northward through the west portion of the county, and meets the north fork of the Yellow Bank in the north end of the county; the combined flow discharges into the Minnesota at the county's NE border. The Lac qui Parle flows eastward through the lower portion of the county, discharging into the Minnesota near the community of Lac qui Parle.

The county terrain consists of rolling hills, knolls and short bluffs near the west end, running to a steep bluff overlooking the Minnesota River valley on its east border. The area is largely devoted to agriculture. The terrain slopes to the north and east, with its highest point near its SW corner, at 1,404' (428m) ASL.

The county's northern boundary is defined by the Minnesota River. Two tributaries, the Lac qui Parle River and the Yellow Bank River, flow through the county to discharge into the Minnesota.

Lakes

 Bolland Slough
 Case Lake
 Flinks Slough (part)
 Kibler Lake
 Lac qui Parle (adjacent to county)
 Marsh Lake (adjacent to county)
 Mud Lake
 Pegg Lake
 Salt Lake (part)
 Swanson Lake

Major highways

  U.S. Highway 75
  U.S. Highway 212 
  Minnesota State Highway 40
  Minnesota State Highway 119

Adjacent counties

 Big Stone County - north
 Swift County - northeast
 Chippewa County - east
 Yellow Medicine County - south
 Deuel County, South Dakota - southwest
 Grant County, South Dakota - northwest

Protected areas

 Acton Marsh State Wildlife Management Area
 Big Stone National Wildlife Refuge (part)
 Borchardt-Rosin State Wildlife Management Area
 Church State Wildlife Management Area
 De Vorak State Wildlife Management Area
 Flinks State Wildlife Management Area
 Haydenville State Wildlife Management Area
 Kemen State Wildlife Management Area
 Kibler Scientific and Natural Area
 Lac qui Parle State Park
 Medicine Pipe State Wildlife Management Area
 Plantation State Wildlife Management Area
 Providence State Wildlife Management Area
 Sweetwater State Wildlife Management Area
 Wild Wings Baxter State Wildlife Management Area
 Yellow Bank Hills Scientific and Natural Area

Demographics

2000 census
As of the 2000 census, there were 8,067 people, 3,316 households, and 2,225 families in the county. The population density was 10.5/sqmi (4.07/km2). There were 3,774 housing units at an average density of 4.93/sqmi (1.90/km2). The racial makeup of the county was 98.85% White, 0.16% Black or African American, 0.22% Native American, 0.32% Asian, 0.06% from other races, and 0.38% from two or more races.  0.26% of the population were Hispanic or Latino of any race. 44.6% were of Norwegian and 35.2% German ancestry.

There were 3,316 households, out of which 27.90% had children under the age of 18 living with them, 59.80% were married couples living together, 4.10% had a female householder with no husband present, and 32.90% were non-families. 30.20% of all households were made up of individuals, and 17.90% had someone living alone who was 65 years of age or older. The average household size was 2.37 and the average family size was 2.96.

The county population contained 24.50% under the age of 18, 5.70% from 18 to 24, 22.70% from 25 to 44, 23.90% from 45 to 64, and 23.20% who were 65 years of age or older. The median age was 43 years. For every 100 females there were 98.60 males. For every 100 females age 18 and over, there were 95.60 males.

The median income for a household in the county was $32,626, and the median income for a family was $41,556. Males had a median income of $27,939 versus $19,681 for females. The per capita income for the county was $17,399. About 5.60% of families and 8.50% of the population were below the poverty line, including 7.80% of those under age 18 and 9.20% of those age 65 or over.

2020 Census

Communities

Cities

 Bellingham
 Boyd
 Dawson
 Louisburg
 Madison (county seat)
 Marietta
 Nassau

Unincorporated communities

 Cerro Gordo
 Haydenville
 Lac qui Parle
 Providence
 Rosen

Townships

 Agassiz Township
 Arena Township
 Augusta Township
 Baxter Township
 Camp Release Township
 Cerro Gordo Township
 Freeland Township
 Garfield Township
 Hamlin Township
 Hantho Township
 Lac qui Parle Township
 Lake Shore Township
 Madison Township
 Manfred Township
 Maxwell Township
 Mehurin Township
 Perry Township
 Providence Township
 Riverside Township
 Ten Mile Lake Township
 Walter Township
 Yellow Bank Township

Law and government

Commissioners

Key staff
Lac qui Parle County's normal operations are coordinated by the County Administrator Jake Sieg along with County Department Heads.

Law Enforcement
The current Sheriff of Lac qui Parle County is Allen Anderson, who became sheriff in 2017 upon the resignation of former Sheriff Lou Sager. Anderson won the 2018 election. The City of Dawson Chief of Police is Andrew Stock.

Politics
Lac qui Parle County voters have generally voted Democratic over the past several decades. In 64% of national elections since 1980 and through 2012, the county supported the Democratic candidate. More recently, the county has shifted towards the Republican Party, backing Donald Trump in both the 2016 and 2020 presidential elections with 59% and 63% of the vote, respectively.

See also
 National Register of Historic Places listings in Lac qui Parle County, Minnesota

References

External links

 Lac qui Parle County website

 
Minnesota counties
1871 establishments in Minnesota
Populated places established in 1871